Peder Christian Kirkegaard from Venstre stood to be re-elected for a third term in Skive Municipality who had since 2007 municipal reform only had mayors from Venstre.
Venstre gained a seat, but was still 2 seats short of an absolute majority. However 3 other parties from the traditional blue bloc won a seat each, and Peder Christian Kirkegaard was chosen to sit for a third term.

Electoral system
For elections to Danish municipalities, a number varying from 9 to 31 are chosen to be elected to the municipal council. The seats are then allocated using the D'Hondt method and a closed list proportional representation.
Skive Municipality had 27 seats in 2021

Unlike in Danish General Elections, in elections to municipal councils, electoral alliances are allowed.

Electoral alliances  

Electoral Alliance 1

Electoral Alliance 2

Electoral Alliance 3

Results

Notes

References 

Skive